Ranna may refer to:

Ranna, a subdivision of the town Auerbach in der Oberpfalz in Bavaria, Germany
Ranna, Estonia, a village in the former municipality Pala Parish, Estonia
Ranna (Danube), a river of Bavaria, Germany and of Upper Austria, tributary of the Danube
Ranna Pumped Storage Power Station, a hydroelectricity power plant of Upper Austria located at lake Ranna
Ranna (Kannada poet), one of the earliest poets of the Kannada language
Ranna (film), a 2015 Indian Kannada family drama film
Ranna the Sleeper, a Necromancer's Bell in the Old Kingdom series of books by Garth Nix, see The Bells (Old Kingdom)

See also
 Ranma (disambiguation)
 Ronna, a given name